Lion is a 2015 Indian Telugu-language action film produced by Rudrapati Ramana Rao under the SLV cinema banner and directed by debutant Satyadev. The plot of the movie is loosely based on the Hollywood movie Unknown. The film stars Nandamuri Balakrishna, Trisha Krishnan,  Radhika Apte and music composed by Mani Sharma.

Plot
The story starts at a hospital in Mumbai, where a man has come out of a coma after 18 months. As soon as he recovers, he is identified as "Godse" by everyone around him. He is surprised when an elderly couple, Bhoopathi and Malathi Devi, claim to be his parents. "Godse" tries to convince everyone that he is not Godse and that he has his own story. Soon, he comes to Hyderabad in search of his true identity and bumps into Mahalakshmi, who he believes is his lover. When she tells him that it is a case of mistaken identity, "Godse" is taken aback. He meets a similar fate when he meets his parents. Suddenly, a girl named Sarayu arrives as "Godse's" wife and tries to remind him of their married life, which creates a lot of confusion. Later, "Godse" finds out that it was all a ruse set up by Bharadwaja, Chief Minister of the state. It is also revealed that his real name is Bose. It is later disclosed that Bose is a sincere and powerful CBI officer on a mission to crack the suspicious death of former Chief Minister of State, Achyuta Ramayya. Bose learns that an influential person, sitting CM Bharadwaj, is behind the death of the former CM. Bose tries to prove him guilty. The rest of this movie deals with why the CM wanted Bose alive and why he set him up with a new identity.

Cast

Soundtrack

Music was composed by Mani Sharma. Audio CD was released on Lahari Music Company. Audio was launched on 9 April 2015, held at Hyderabad Shilpakala Vedika by Andhra Pradesh Chief Minister Nara Chandrababu Naidu.

Pre-release business
The film overseas rights acquired by SLV cinema for good price.

Release
The film received U/A certificate from Censor Board due to violence in second half. The film released on 15 May 2015 in 900+ screens worldwide.

Critical reception
The film received mixed reviews from critics.
123Telugu.com rated 3/5 and stated On the whole, Lion is a complete Balakrishna film right from the word go. His power packed performance is the major asset and will go down well with the masses. On the flip side, lack of proper handling of the subject and a predictable second half makes this film just an ok watch. Watch it only for Balayya. Idlebrain rated 3/5 and stated Interval episode is interesting. Second half has many episodes that exhilarate fans. Lion is a film that completely revolves around Balakrishna and depends on his performance. A good screenplay and right buildups (elevating emotions while building up to the key scenes) would have done a world of good to the cinema. On a whole, Lion is NBK's show! The Hindu stated Radhika wears a blank expression. There is another gem, a man confronts Balaiyya, “Natho matladataniki yentha dhairyam neeku” and the latter retorts “Neetho matladataniki dhairyam enduku...Iphone unte chaalu.” Lion takes plenty of retrograde steps. Mani Sarma too disappoints and the hero struggles with his steps. Time for Balakrishna to do some soul searching or his films would be just another addition to the number of films he has done.

Box office
The film opened good response in AP. The film collected  (Share) at the Andhra Pradesh and Telangana (AP/T) box office on first day. The film has collected  (Share) in AP. The film collected  (WW Share) in its extended first week end at the box office . The film collected a total   (WW Share) in its first week and gross would be the box office.

References

External links
 

2015 films
Films scored by Mani Sharma
Indian action films
2010s Telugu-language films
2015 action films